"New Life" is the second UK single by Depeche Mode from their debut Speak and Spell recorded at Blackwing Studios in south London, originally released on 13 June 1981. It was not commercially released in the United States.

Background
Vince Clarke wrote the song. There were two versions of the song available. The 7" version would later become the "album version", as it would eventually appear on the UK version of Speak & Spell, released in October 1981, and a 12" "remix", which differs from the album version, in that it has a different intro, intensely percussive and harder, and an added synth part in the "solo" vocal section in the middle of the song, which is not present on the 7" mix. The "remix" would later appear on the US version of Speak & Spell.

The single became Depeche Mode's breakthrough hit in the UK, peaking at #11. On 25 June 1981, the band performed "New Life" during their debut on the BBC's Top of the Pops. The band would perform the song twice more on the show, on 16 July and 30 July 1981.

The B-side, "Shout!", is the first Depeche Mode song to get a 12" extended remix, called the "Rio Mix". This mix would later appear on the remix compilation Remixes 81–04, released in 2004. It is the earliest recorded song available on the compilation.

Formats and track listings
These are the formats and track listings of major single releases of "New Life":

7": Mute / 7Mute14 (UK)
 "New Life" – 3:43
 "Shout!" – 3:44

12": Mute / 12Mute14 (UK)
 "New Life" (Remix) – 3:58
 "Shout!" (Rio Mix) – 7:31

CD: Mute / CDMute14 (UK)1
 "New Life" (Remix) – 3:58
 "Shout!" – 3:44
 "Shout!" (Rio Mix) – 7:31

CD: Sire / 40290-2 (US)1
 "New Life" (Remix) – 3:58
 "Shout!" – 3:44
 "Shout!" (Rio Mix) – 7:31

Notes
1: CD released in 1991.
All songs written by Vince Clarke.

Charts

References

External links
 Single information from the official Depeche Mode web site
 AllMusic review 

1981 songs
1981 singles
Depeche Mode songs
Songs written by Vince Clarke
Song recordings produced by Daniel Miller
Mute Records singles
UK Independent Singles Chart number-one singles